The following lists events that happened during 1962 in New Zealand.

Population
 Estimated population as of 31 December: 2,515,800
 Increase since 31 December 1961: 54,500 (2.21%)
 Males per 100 females: 101.0

Incumbents

Regal and viceregal
Head of State – Elizabeth II
Governor-General – The Viscount Cobham GCMG TD, followed by Brigadier Sir Bernard Fergusson GCMG GCVO DSO OBE.

Government
Speaker of the House – Ronald Algie.
Prime Minister – Keith Holyoake
Deputy Prime Minister – Jack Marshall.
Minister of Finance – Harry Lake.
Minister of Foreign Affairs – Keith Holyoake.
Attorney-General – Ralph Hanan.
Chief Justice — Sir Harold Barrowclough

Parliamentary opposition 
 Leader of the Opposition –   Walter Nash (Labour)

Main centre leaders
Mayor of Auckland – Dove-Myer Robinson
Mayor of Hamilton – Denis Rogers
Mayor of Wellington – Frank Kitts
Mayor of Christchurch – George Manning
Mayor of Dunedin – Stuart Sidey

Events
The Office of the Ombudsman was established

January
 1 January: Samoa (then called Western Samoa) attains full independence, becoming the first independent Polynesian territory.

February
 5 February: Dunedin lawyer James Patrick Ward was killed by a letter bomb sent to his office in what police described as "one of the most callous murders in the history of New Zealand crime".

March

April

June

July

August

September

October

November

December

Arts and literature
R.A.K. Mason wins the Robert Burns Fellowship.

See 1962 in art, 1962 in literature, :Category:1962 books

Music

See: 1962 in music

Radio and television
New Zealand Broadcasting Service (NZBS) is restructured on 1 April to form New Zealand Broadcasting Corporation.
An outside broadcast van is in use in Auckland, and similar vans are ordered for Wellington and Christchurch.
Dunedin gets television service with the launch of DNTV2 on 31 July. 
There are 23,343 licensed television sets in New Zealand.

See: 1962 in New Zealand television, 1962 in television, List of TVNZ television programming, :Category:Television in New Zealand, Public broadcasting in New Zealand

Film

See: :Category:1962 film awards, 1962 in film, List of New Zealand feature films, Cinema of New Zealand, :Category:1962 films

Sport

Athletics
 27 January: Peter Snell sets a new world record for the mile of 3m 54.4s, running at Cook's Gardens, Wanganui.
 Barry Magee wins his second national title in the men's marathon, clocking 2:24:55.4 in Auckland.

British Empire and Commonwealth Games

Chess
 The 69th National Chess Championship was held in Auckland, and was won by G.G. Haase of Dunedin.

Horse racing

Harness racing
 New Zealand Trotting Cup – Lordship defeats Cardigan Bay in a rain-affected race
 Auckland Trotting Cup – Dandy Briar

Lawn bowls
The national outdoor lawn bowls championships are held in Christchurch.
 Men's singles champion – Jeff Barron (Miramar Bowling Club)
 Men's pair champions – Frank Livingstone, Bob McDonald (skip) (Onehunga Bowling Club)
 Men's fours champions – W. Humphreys, S. Barlow, H.W. Todd, R. Brown (skip) (Marlborough Bowling Club)

Soccer
 The Chatham Cup is won by Hamilton Technical Old Boys who beat Northern of Dunedin 4–1 in the final.
 Provincial league champions:
	Auckland:	Eastern Suburbs AFC
	Bay of Plenty:	Rangers
	Buller:	Waimangaroa Utd
	Canterbury:	Western
	Franklin:	Manurewa AFC
	Hawke's Bay:	Napier Rovers
	Manawatu:	Thistle
	Marlborough:	Woodbourne
	Nelson:	Rangers
	Northland:	Otangarei United
	Otago:	Northern AFC
	Poverty Bay:	Eastern Union
	South Canterbury:	Thistle
	Southland:	Invercargill Thistle
	Taranaki:	Moturoa
	Waikato:	Hamilton Technical OB
	Wairarapa:	Lansdowne United
	Wanganui:	Wanganui Athletic
	Wellington:	Northern
	West Coast:	Runanga
 The inaugural Rothmans Cup was played between the champion clubs from Auckland, Wellington, Canterbury and Otago as a de facto national championship. The final was won by Northern AFC of Dunedin 3-2 on aggregate.

Births
 12 January (in England): Terry Wiles, thalidomide survivor.
 4 February: Frank Bunce, rugby union player.
 17 February: Tony Blain, cricketer.
 1 March: Russell Coutts, yachtsman.
 4 March: John Young, composer.
 15 March: Trevor Franklin, cricketer.
 6 June: Grant Fox, rugby player.
 8 June: John Cutler, yachtsman.
 16 June Jonathan Temm, lawyer.
 22 July: Rena Owen, actress.
 5 August: Richard de Groen, cricketer.
 13 September: Brian Fowler, cyclist.
 21 September: Kelly Evernden, tennis player.
 22 September: Martin Crowe, cricketer.
 27 September: Gavin Larsen, cricketer.
 9 October: Paul Radisich, racing driver.
 12 October: Mark S. Olsen, painter.
 7 November: Debbie Hockley, cricketer.
 29 December: Wynton Rufer, soccer player.
 Tim Chadwick, artist and writer.
 Jon Stevens, singer.
:Category:1962 births

Deaths
 26 April: Jerry Skinner, Labour politician.
 20 June John Houston, historian and writer.
 14 July: Janet Mackenzie, New Zealand teacher
 18 July: G. H. Cunningham, mycologist and plant pathologist.
 18 September: Clyde Carr, Labour politician.
 8 October: Donald Charles Cameron, Mayor of Dunedin
 20 October: Cora Louisa Burrell, politician (MLC). 
 28 October: Bill Schramm, Labour politician and 11th Speaker of the House of Representatives.

See also
List of years in New Zealand
Timeline of New Zealand history
History of New Zealand
Military history of New Zealand
Timeline of the New Zealand environment
Timeline of New Zealand's links with Antarctica

References

 
New Zealand
Years of the 20th century in New Zealand